Central Massachusetts is the geographically central region of Massachusetts. Though definitions vary, most include all of Worcester County and the northwest corner of Middlesex County. Worcester, the largest city in the area and the seat of Worcester County, is often considered the cultural capital of the region. Other populous cities include Fitchburg, Gardner, Leominster, and arguably Marlborough and Hopkinton, MA.

Transportation 
The Massachusetts Turnpike (Interstate 90) runs through the southern part of Worcester County. Other interstate highways in the area are I-190, I-290, I-395, and I-495 on the eastern edge. Route 2 is another major east–west highway that spans the northern part of Worcester County. Other significant thoroughfares include Route 9, Route 146, and U.S. Route 20.

See also
Montachusett-North County
South County

References

External links

Discover Central Massachusetts - the region's official tourism bureau

Regions of Massachusetts